"Jamboree" is a song by American hip hop group Naughty by Nature for their fifth studio album Nineteen Naughty Nine: Nature's Fury (1999), featuring a chorus with R&B group Zhané. The song was a relative commercial success, peaking at number 10 on the Billboard Hot 100 and number-one on the Hot Rap Singles, becoming their first song since "O.P.P." to reach number-one on the Rap charts. It also spent 5 weeks at number-one on the Canadian RPM Dance Chart. The song was certified gold on August 3, 1999, becoming the group's fourth and final single to reach at least gold status.

Single track listing

A-Side
"Jamboree" (Club Mix)- 3:31  
"Jamboree" (TV track)- 3:32  
"Jamboree" (Acappella)- 3:10

B-Side
"Jamboree" (Radio Mix)- 3:32  
"On the Run" (Album Version)- 3:19  
"On the Run" (Instrumental)- 3:21

Charts and certifications

Weekly charts

Year-end charts

Certifications

|}

References

Naughty by Nature songs
1999 singles
1999 songs
Arista Records singles
Song recordings produced by Naughty by Nature
Songs written by Treach
Songs written by KayGee
Songs written by Vin Rock
Zhané songs